Liberty Township is a township in Geary County, Kansas, USA.  As of the 2000 census, its population was 225.

History
Liberty Township was organized in 1875.

Geography
According to the USGS, it contains five cemeteries: Moss Springs, Olson, Quaker, Upper Humboldt and Welcome.

The streams of East Branch Humboldt Creek, West Branch Davis Creek, West Branch Dry Creek and West Branch Humboldt Creek run through this township.

References

 USGS Geographic Names Information System (GNIS)

Further reading

External links
 City-Data.com

Townships in Geary County, Kansas
Townships in Kansas